Monosomy is a form of aneuploidy with the presence of only one chromosome from a pair. Partial monosomy occurs when a portion of one chromosome in a pair is missing.

Human monosomy
Human conditions due to monosomy:
 Turner syndrome – People with Turner syndrome typically have one X chromosome instead of the usual two X chromosomes. Turner syndrome is the only full monosomy that is seen in humans — all other cases of full monosomy are lethal and the individual will not survive development.
 Cri du chat syndrome – (French for "cry of the cat" after the persons' malformed larynx) a partial monosomy caused by a deletion of the end of the short arm of chromosome 5
 1p36 deletion syndrome – a partial monosomy caused by a deletion at the end of the short arm of chromosome 1
 17q12 microdeletion syndrome - a partial monosomy caused by a deletion of part of the long arm of chromosome 17

See also
 Anaphase lag
 Miscarriage

References

External links 

Cytogenetics
Chromosomal abnormalities